Mal Pelo is a Catalan contemporary dance ensemble based in Barcelona, Spain. The ensemble was established in January 1989 by choreographers Pep Ramis and María Muñoz, who continue to act as Artistic Directors. Since its inception, the company has made itself well known in Spain and the rest of Europe. The ensemble has also performed in the U.S. at festivals and in New York City at the Baryshnikov Arts Center. The group's work is described as "rooted in its own poetic view of the world".

Works
The company produces both traditional and multi-media works. Selected compositions include:

Quarere, 1989
Lucas, 1990
Sur, Perros Del Sur, 1992
Canción para los Pájaros, 1993
La Mirada de Búbal, 1993
Dol, 1994
Zarco, 1995
La Calle Del Imaginero, 1996
Canción de Bernabé, 1997
Orache, 1998
El Alma Del Bicho, 1999
L'Animal a L'Esquena, 2000
Canción para Stantiago, 2001
Canción de Paula, 2001
Atrás los Ojos, 2002
An (el silencio), 2003
Bach, 2004
On a Remplacé les Coqs, 2004
Atlas (o antes de llegar a Barataria), 2005
Testimoni de Llops, 2006
He Visto Caballos, 2008
All the Names, 2010

References

External links
Official Site
An (el silenci) performed by Mal Pelo

1989 establishments in Spain
Performing groups established in 1989
Dance in Spain
1989 establishments in Catalonia